Russell Louis Dedeaux (December 7, 1913 – January 2, 1956) was an American baseball pitcher in the Negro leagues. He played with the Newark Eagles and New York Black Yankees in 1941 and the Los Angeles White Sox in 1946. He was killed in a car accident in 1956.

References

External links
 and Seamheads

Los Angeles White Sox players
New York Black Yankees players
Newark Eagles players
1911 births
1956 deaths
Baseball players from Louisiana
Baseball pitchers
20th-century African-American sportspeople
Xavier University alumni